Kozje is a small town in eastern Slovenia. It is the seat of the Municipality of Kozje. It is the main settlement of the Kozje region. The area is part of the traditional region of Styria. The municipality is now included in the Savinja Statistical Region. It is one of the oldest settlements in the area, first mentioned in written documents dating to 1016. It was granted market rights before 1384. 

The parish church in the settlement is dedicated to the Assumption of Mary and belongs to the Roman Catholic Diocese of Celje. It was built on the site of an earlier building in the 15th century and has major 17th-century alterations. A second church in the settlement is dedicated to Saint Hemma. It was built in around 1466 with 16th-century modifications and the nave extended in 1861.

References

External links
 Kozje on Geopedia

Populated places in the Municipality of Kozje